Operation Bowler was an air attack on Venice harbour by Allied aircraft on 21 March 1945, as part of the Italian campaign of the Second World War. It was led by Acting Wing Commander, later Group Captain, George Westlake of the Royal Air Force.

By early 1945, the rail and road networks of northern Italy had sustained severe damage, forcing the Germans to resort to shipping goods into Venice and then moving them from there along rivers and canals. An attack on the city's harbour was thus deemed necessary by Allied command, although the risk of damage to the city's architectural and artistic treasures was high, as it had been in other battles of the Italian campaign, such as Battle of Monte Cassino. The operation was planned to be extremely precise to avoid any such damage and was named Operation Bowler by Air Vice-Marshal Robert Foster, as a reminder to those involved that they would be "bowler hatted" (returned to civilian life) or worse should Venice itself be damaged.

Having assessed the weather, Westlake led the attack in a Curtiss P-40 Kittyhawk from No. 250 Squadron RAF, part of No. 239 Wing RAF, which was composed of Kittyhawk and Mustang squadrons and specialised in dive-bombing operations. The fighters attacked the gun defences of the docks and, that done, the bombers then dived in to attack almost vertically to ensure precision, with civilian observers feeling safe enough to climb on the city's rooftops to observe the attack and with the only architectural damage being no more than a few broken windows.

It seriously damaged a large cargo ship and destroyed five warehouses, an Axis mine stockpile (blowing a 100-yard hole in the quayside) and other harbour infrastructure, such as an underwater training establishment for frogmen and human torpedoes.

Westlake was recognised soon afterwards, awarded the Distinguished Service Order for "excellent leadership, great tactical ability and exceptional determination", having already won the Distinguished Flying Cross in 1942 for continuous gallantry in around 300 operational sorties.

Notes

External links
 

Conflicts in 1945
World War II operations and battles of the Italian Campaign
History of Venice after 1797
Aerial bombing operations and battles
Aerial operations and battles of World War II involving the United Kingdom
Battles of World War II involving the United States
Battles of World War II involving Italy
1945 in Italy
March 1945 events
1940s in Venice